Pundareekapuram Temple is a small Hindu temple atop a little rise called Midayikunnam near Thalayolaparambu in Kottayam. Architecturally it is not very different from any typical village temple of Kerala. A tiled and saddle roofed square "Chuttambalam" encloses a square sanctum sanctorum. Appended to the square enclosure is a small ‘balikkalpura’. The idol worshipped here is the image of Vishnu sitting astride his celestial vehicle Garuda together with Bhoodevi. This is a rare icon.

There’s a fine picture of Siva and Parvathi sitting beneath the Kalpavriksha; a powerful picture of Durga vanquishing the buffalo-headed demon Mahisha, the pranks of Krishna the divine boy of Ambadi; a picture of a Yakshi the dangerous seductress of legends; Rama Pattabhishekham or the coronation of Sri Rama; Siva Thandava and a picture of Sastha astride a horse to point out a few of the striking paintings at Pundareekapuram.

Since the temple is tucked away in off rarely trodden village road, these paintings have for long remained relatively obscure. But these murals, no doubt can hold their own against the better known wall-paintings of Padmanabhapuram and Mattancheri Palaces. In all probability these murals were painted during the later half of the 18th century.

Another characteristic of the Pundareekapuram paintings and Kerala murals in general are the boldness and accuracy of the lines which give a unique force to the paintings.

Thousands of Nagaraja images are installed here with Garuda.

See also
 Temples of Kerala

References

External links
keralamurals.com
kerala.gov.in
kerala-travel-tours.com
prd.kerala.gov.in

Hindu temples in Kottayam district